William Barrett (born 1960) is an American former competition swimmer who won a silver medal in the 200-meter individual medley at the 1982 World Aquatics Championships. He was recognized as the Pacific-10 Conference swimmer of the year for three consecutive years.

Swimming
In 1980, he won a national title in the same event and set a new world record.  He also qualified for the 1980 Summer Olympics in the 100-meter breaststroke, but could not compete because of the United States-led boycott over the Soviet invasion of Afghanistan.  The same year, Swimming World Magazine named him the American Swimmer of the Year.

Professional life
Barrett enrolled in the University of California, Los Angeles (UCLA), and swam for coach Ron Ballatore's UCLA Bruins swimming and diving team in NCAA competition from 1980 to 1982.

See also
 List of University of California, Los Angeles people
 List of World Aquatics Championships medalists in swimming (men)
 World record progression 200 metres individual medley

References

1960 births
Living people
American male breaststroke swimmers
American male medley swimmers
World record setters in swimming
Swimmers at the 1983 Pan American Games
UCLA Bruins men's swimmers
World Aquatics Championships medalists in swimming
Pan American Games silver medalists for the United States
Pan American Games medalists in swimming
Medalists at the 1983 Pan American Games
20th-century American people